Güzelyalı is a place name in Turkish and may refer to:

Güzelyalı, Çanakkale
Güzelyalı, Elâzığ
Güzelyalı, Manavgat
Güzelyalı, Pendik
Güzelyalı, Atakum